Nicolás Juan Gabriel Miracco (born 12 April 1991) is an Argentine professional footballer who plays as a forward or winger for Nueva Chicago.

Career
Miracco made his debut for his first club, Aldosivi, on 16 June 2012 in a 0–0 home draw versus Defensa y Justicia in the 2011–12 Primera B Nacional. Six days later, on 22 June, he made his second appearance in a 3–3 draw against Gimnasia y Esgrima. Twenty-two league appearances followed in the next two seasons for Miracco. In 2014, Aldosivi won promotion into the Argentine Primera División and Miracco made fifteen appearances whilst scoring his first four career goals; most notably scoring two versus Instituto. He scored once in thirteen games in his first season in Argentina's top-flight (2015) before departing on loan in 2016.

In 2016, Miracco joined Primera B Nacional side Santamarina. He participated in fifteen matches and scored three goals before returning to Aldosivi. In September 2017, Miracco signed for Sarmiento of Primera B Nacional. He made his 100th career appearance on 20 May 2018, during a victory away to Brown; which he also scored in.

In June 2019, Miracco signed a one-year deal with newly promoted Argentine Primera División side Central Córdoba de Santiago del Estero. On 24 August 2020, Miracco moved to Arsenal de Sarandí. After a year and a half at Arsenal, Miracco moved to Nueva Chicago in January 2022.

Career statistics
.

References

External links

1991 births
Living people
Sportspeople from Mar del Plata
Argentine people of Italian descent
Argentine footballers
Association football midfielders
Association football forwards
Primera Nacional players
Argentine Primera División players
Aldosivi footballers
Club y Biblioteca Ramón Santamarina footballers
Club Atlético Sarmiento footballers
Central Córdoba de Santiago del Estero footballers
Arsenal de Sarandí footballers
Nueva Chicago footballers